Yarabasi Devendrappa is an Indian politician who is the current Member of Parliament, Lok Sabha from Bellary, Karnataka in the 2019 Indian general election as member of the Bharatiya Janata Party.

Early life
Devendrappa was born in Arasikere, Ballari, Karnataka.

Political career
Devendrappa was originally a member of Congress, and unsuccessfully contested from Jagalur in 2010. He was named as a potential Congress candidate during bypolls for the Ballari MP seat in 2018. Devendrappa is a relative and loyalist of Ramesh Jarkiholi, who, at the time was a Congress rebel and closet BJP supporter. He was chosen as BJP nominee because of this, and because he was approved by B Sriramulu, a Ballari BJP strongman, and was supported by Ramesh Jarkiholi. In the 2019 polls, after being denied the Congress ticket, he defeated V. S. Ugrappa to win the Ballari seat for the BJP.

References

External links
 Official biographical sketch in Parliament of India website

India MPs 2019–present
Lok Sabha members from Karnataka
Living people
Bharatiya Janata Party politicians from Karnataka
People from Bellary
1951 births